Robert Leslie Bradford (born 29 April 1952) was an English cricketer. He was a right-handed batsman who played for Norfolk. He was born in Swardeston.

Bradford, who represented Norfolk in the Minor Counties Championship between 1978 and 1988, made just a single List A appearance, in the 1984 NatWest Trophy, against Hampshire. From the middle order, he scored a single run before being bowled out by Elvis Reifer.

External links
Robert Bradford at CricketArchive 

1952 births
Living people
English cricketers
Norfolk cricketers
People from Swardeston
Sportspeople from Norfolk